Manek Bedi is a Bollywood actor. He is currently a Film and TV producer and has produced a big hit show "Hitler Didi" for Zee TV.

Filmography

References

External links

Living people
Indian male film actors
Hindi film producers
Year of birth missing (living people)